The pale prinia (Prinia somalica) is a species of bird in the family Cisticolidae.
It is found in Ethiopia, Kenya, Somalia, and South Sudan.
Its natural habitats are dry savanna and subtropical or tropical dry shrubland.

References

pale prinia
Birds of the Horn of Africa
pale prinia
Taxonomy articles created by Polbot